The Saba Conservation Foundation (SCF) is a non-governmental organization that is concerned with the conservation of the natural and cultural heritage of the small Caribbean island of Saba, which is a part of the Kingdom of the Netherlands. Saba is part of the inner arc of the Leeward Islands chain of the Lesser Antilles.

The SCF was founded in 1987. Its mission is "to commit to the preservation and enhancement of the marine and terrestrial environment on Saba through education, scientific research, monitoring and enforcement." The SCF has seven employees, and a board with ten members. The Foundation forms part of the Dutch Caribbean Nature Alliance.

SCF is headquartered at Fort Bay (Saba's only harbor), with a second office at the Saba Trail and Information Centre in Windwardside.

Managed areas

Marine areas

Saba National Marine Park

The SCF manages the marine park and also two hyperbaric facilities for divers.

Saba Bank National Park

In 2010, the very large submerged atoll known as the Saba Bank, which lies southwest of the island of Saba, was designated as a Netherlands National Park. This atoll is the flat top of a seamount.

On land

Saba Walking Trail Network
The SCF is the management agency for the numerous hiking trails, which are known as the Saba Trail Network.

Land-based nature reserves
Legislation to support the official status of the  "Saba National Land Park" was in process in 2012. An "Elfin Forest Reserve" near the top of Mount Scenery (the highest point on the island) is also a possibility.

References

External links

 SCF website
 "Sea and Learn" on Saba

Nature conservation organizations based in North America
Nature conservation in the Caribbean
Saba (island)
Environmental organisations based in the Netherlands
Environmental organizations established in 1987
1987 establishments in the Netherlands Antilles